Secret Samadhi is the fourth studio album by American alternative rock band Live. It debuted at number 1 on the Billboard 200 upon its release on February 18, 1997. It includes the singles "Lakini's Juice", "Rattlesnake", "Turn My Head", and "Freaks". The album was certified 2× Platinum by the RIAA on July 8, 1999.

This is the first Live recording to be produced by Jay Healy since their 1990 cassette EP Divided Mind, Divided Planet.

The US release uses HDCD encoding, but the package is not labeled as HDCD.

Track listing

Personnel
Live
Ed Kowalczyk – lead vocals, rhythm guitar
Chad Taylor – lead guitar, backing vocals
Patrick Dahlheimer – bass
Chad Gracey – drums

Additional musicians
Tim Bauber – engineering
Jon Carin – keyboards
Jennifer Charles – vocals on "Ghost"
Jay Healy – engineering, production
Femio Hernandez – engineering, production
Ted Jensen – mastering
Doug Katsaros – string arrangements on "Lakini's Juice" and "Turn My Head"
Gerardo Lopez – engineering, production
Tom Lord-Alge – mixing
Greg Thompson – engineering, production

Charts

Weekly charts

Year-end charts

Singles

Certifications

References

1997 albums
Live (band) albums
Radioactive Records albums